Hedl is a surname. Notable people with the surname include: 

Drago Hedl (born 1950), Croatian investigative journalist
Jan Sahara Hedl (born 1957), Czech singer-songwriter
Raimund Hedl (born 1974), Austrian football player and coach